Mudnakudu Chinnaswamy (22 September 1954) is an Indian Kannada Poet, hailing from Mudnakudu village in Chamarajanagar District of Karnataka. He received Kendra Sahitya Academy award in 2022, for his work "Bahutvada Bhaaratha mattu Bouddha Thaatvikate".

He has two post graduate degrees viz., M.Com., and M.A.(Kan), with a D.Lit. in Social Sciences. He was a Finance Executive by profession and retired as Director (Finance) & Financial Advisor from Bangalore Metropolitan Transport Corporation in March 2014. Poetry is his passion but he has worked in other genres of literature as well, besides having a wide range of interests in culture, social work and theatre. He has brought out 40 books so far which include eight collections of poetry, seven of essays, three plays and two collections of short stories.

Works
His contribution to Kannada literature are listed below.

Poetry 
 Kondigalu mattu Mullubeligalu – 1989
 Godhooli – 1993			                       
 Nanondu Maravagiddare – 1998
 Chappali Mattu Nanu – 2001
 Kanakambari – 2004
 Matte Male Baruva Munna – 2000
 Chandirana Kannu Hingalarada Hunnu – 2005 (Selected Poems)
 Buddha Beladingalu – 2010

Plays
 Kendamandala – 1990
 Mooru Beedi Natakagalu – 2004
 Bahuroopi (Poetry drama) – 2003
 Mudnakudu Natakagalu – 2010

Essays
 Nondavara Novu – 2002
 Maathu Manthana – 2004
 Ondu koda halina samara – 2008
 Aparimitada Kattale – 2010
 Chinnudi – 2015

Short stories 
 Mohada Deepa – 1999
 Papa prajne – 2015

Monograph
 Bhima Boyi – 1994
 Belakina Saradararu – 2015

Letters
 Ole Okkane – 2005

Translations
 Yuva Bouddharigondu Darshana – 2002
 Deegha Nikaya – 2012 (Revision for Mahabodhi Society, Bengaluru)
 Dalita Darshana – 2014

Edited
 Dalita Kathegalu – 1996 (for Karnataka Sahitya Academy)
 Kavya Bangara – 2005
 Poems of Dasara Poets' meet – 2004    
 Marali Manege – 2006 (A souvenir on the event of Buddhanedege… a dalit march for equality commemorating 50th year of Ambedkar's conversion)
 Kavya 2005 – 2008 (for Karnataka Sahitya Academi)

Translated into other languages
 Angar Ki Choti Per – 2001 (Translated into Hindi by Prof. Dharanendra Kurakuri)
 Poemas: Mudnakudu Chinnaswamy – 2005 (Translated into Spanish by Prof. Rowena Hill)
 Zakhm Kasak Awaz – 2012 (Translated into Urdu by Nooruddin Noor)
 Before It Rains Again – (Translated by Rowena Hill)
 Asmita Ki Khoj – 2010(Translation of "Ondu koda halina samara’ a collection of essays into Hindi by Bhalachandra Jayshetty)

About the author
 Bayala Belaku – 2008 (Edit: Appagere Somashekara) 
 Beyuva Bege – 2012 (A research work on Dr. Mudnakudu  by Dr. Mallappa Chalavadi)

Awards and honours 
Kendra Sahitya Academy award in 2022, for his work "Bahutvada Bhaaratha mattu Bouddha Thaatvikate".

 Kannada University, Hampi has awarded D.Lit., for the thesis The Caste System and Untouchabality in India in the background of the Concept of Global Village. 
 Felicitation by University of Andes, and Center for Asia, Africa and Latin American countries Diaspora, Merida in May 2004.
 Nicaragua’s Diriamba Municipal Corporation conferred the honour as “Illustrious Visitor” and Granada Municipal Corporation felicitated and honoured as “Distinguished Visitor” in Feb, 2007.
 Bendre Award- 2001 by Bendre Pratishtana, Dharwad.

 Karnataka State Sahitya Academy award - 2009
 Dr. Sa. Ja. Nagalotimath sahitya prshasti- 2010, Bidar for ‘Aparimitadakattale’ collection of essays.
 Kannda University, Hampi has awarded D.Lit., for the thesis The Caste System and Untouchabality in India in the background of the Concept of Global Village. 
 Felicitation by University of Andes, and Center for Asia, Africa and Latin American countries Diaspora, Merida in May 2004.
 Nicaragua’s Diriamba Municipal Corporation conferred the honour as “Illustrious Visitor” and Granada Municipal Corporation felicitated and honoured as “Distinguished Visitor” in Feb, 2007.
 Bendre Award - 2001 by Bendre Pratishtana, Dharwad.
 Karnataka State Sahitya Academy award -2009
 Dr. Sa. Ja. Nagalotimath sahitya prshasti- 2010, Bidar for ‘Aparimitadakattale’ collection of essays.
 Karnataka State Rajyotsava Award- 2014 to mention a few
 Other notable events.
 Karnataka Sahitya Academy has produced a documentary on Life and works of Dr.Mudnakudu Chinnaswamy and brought out a CD besides uploading in its website.
 Dept. of information and Publicity has produced a documentary on the life of Mudnakudu Chinnaswamy under ‘Neladasiri’ series.
 “Munjane Surya” an audio CD containing songs of MC has been brought out by the Lahari Audio Co.Ltd., Bangalore.
 Doordarshan and other visual and print media have interviewed and published his literary achievements a number of times. 
 “The Outlook” weekly magazine in its special issue of April 26, 2021[Ambedkar Anniversary Special] adjudged him as one among ‘50 Dalits, Remaking India’ and carried a brief which is a significant recognition at national level.

Website 

 https://mudnakudu.com/

See also
 Kannada language
 Kannada literature
 Kannada poetry
 Dalit Literature

References

External links

 Ash only knows the heat of burning, 2 March 2016 
 Dalit Poetry in Kannada: Mudnakudu Chinnaswamy

1954 births
Living people
Kannada poets
Kannada-language writers
People from Chamarajanagar district
Indian male poets
Indian male novelists
Poets from Karnataka
Kannada dramatists and playwrights
University of Mysore alumni
20th-century Indian poets
20th-century Indian novelists
Novelists from Karnataka
Dalit activists
Activists from Karnataka
20th-century Indian male writers
Recipients of the Sahitya Akademi Award in Kannada